The Mount Vernon Arsenal is a former United States Army munitions depot (arsenal), was used as a prison for captured Native Americans, and was served as a psychiatric hospital. It is listed on the National Register of Historic Places in Mount Vernon, Alabama. The site is home to the now closed Searcy Hospital.  It was listed on the National Register of Historic Places on May 26, 1988 as the Mount Vernon Arsenal-Searcy Hospital Complex.

History
The Mount Vernon Arsenal was established by the United States Army near the Mobile River, three miles west of Fort Stoddert, and approximately 30 miles inland from the Gulf of Mexico. Along with the Kennebec Arsenal in Augusta, Maine, it is one of the most complete antebellum arsenals surviving to the present day. Established in 1828 as an ordnance manufacturing base, the Mount Vernon Arsenal served as one of the U.S. Army's main ammunition plants from its inception until the Civil War.

On January 4, 1861, troops of the Alabama state militia took possession of the arsenal on the orders of Alabama governor Andrew B. Moore. The takeover from the small US Army force, commanded by Captain Jesse L. Reno, was peaceful and bloodless. After Alabama joined with other seceded states to form the Confederacy, the Arsenal was turned over to the Confederate Army for the duration of the war. In 1862, after the Battle of New Orleans, the Confederacy moved ammunition manufacturing from the Mount Vernon Arsenal to Selma, Alabama. Selma offered a more secure location farther away from Union forces.

The Confederate Army held the Arsenal almost until the end of the Civil War. After the war was over, the Arsenal was returned to the federal government and the site was renamed the Mount Vernon Barracks. From 1887 to 1894 the Barracks was used as a prison for captured Apache people, including Geronimo and his followers. Walter Reed, the United States Army physician who confirmed that yellow fever is spread by mosquitoes, served as post surgeon in the 1880s. In 1895, the site was deeded to the state of Alabama.

See also
 National Register of Historic Places listings in Mobile County, Alabama

References

External links
 
 
 

Alabama in the American Civil War
United States Army arsenals
American Civil War forts
Historic districts in Mobile County, Alabama
National Register of Historic Places in Mobile County, Alabama
1828 establishments in Alabama
Greek Revival architecture in Alabama
Historic districts on the National Register of Historic Places in Alabama